Dayaram Parmar (born 7 April 1945) is an Indian politician who is an elected member from Kherwara Assembly constituency in Udaipur district of Rajasthan. And he is a member of the Indian National Congress party.

References

1945 births
Living people
People from Udaipur
Indian National Congress politicians from Rajasthan
Rajasthan MLAs 2018–2023